"Stories" is a 1990 single by German band Boney M. It peaked at #26 in Switzerland and #94 in the UK. The single was based on an instrumental 1989 underground favourite by Izit, which itself was a re-work of a 1972 recording by Belgian group Chakachas. With added lyrics by Peter Bischof-Fallenstein, "Stories" was released as a response to the withdrawn "Everybody Wants to Dance Like Josephine Baker", released illegally under the group name by original members Marcia Barrett, Bobby Farrell, Maizie Williams and new singer Madeleine Davis. "Stories" launched a short-lived 'official' Boney M. line-up consisting of original lead singer Liz Mitchell and Reggie Tsiboe (who had replaced Farrell 1982-86) and two new girls, Sharon Steven and Patty Onoyewenjo. Never appearing on any studio album by the group, Stories was added as a bonus track on the remastered 2007 edition of the group's 1977 album Love for Sale. An unreleased 3:54 mix was used in the video clip for the track.

Single releases
Germany
7"
 "Stories" - 4:23 / "Rumours" (Instrumental) - 3:14 (Hansa 112 997-100, 1990)

12" 
 "Stories" (Special Club Mix) - 7:53 / "Stories" (Radio Mix) - 4:09

Vinyl, 12", 45 RPM, Maxi-Single, (Promo Hansa – 612 997) housed in a special promo only
picture cover  / A: Different mix from the commercial version.  Length of song mentioned on sleeve is incorrect

12"
 "Stories" (Special Club Mix) - 8:06 / "Stories" (Radio Mix) - 4:23 / "Rumours" (Instrumental) 3:14 (Hansa 612 997-213, 1990)

CD
 "Stories" (Special Club Mix) - 8:06 / "Stories" (Radio Mix) - 4:23 / "Rumours" (Instrumental) - 3:14 (Hansa 662 997-211, 1990)

Personnel

Reggie Tsiboe - vocals
Liz Mitchell - vocals, rap
Sharon Steven - backing vocals
Patty Onoyewenjo - backing vocals
Frank Farian - backing vocals

Sources
http://www.rateyourmusic.com/artist/boneym

1990 singles
Songs written by Jean Kluger
Boney M. songs
1990 songs
Song recordings produced by Frank Farian
Hansa Records singles
Songs written by Peter Bischof-Fallenstein